İske imlâ (İske imlâ: , , , "Old Orthography") is a variant of the Arabic script, used for the Tatar language before 1920, as well as for the Old Tatar language. This alphabet can be referred to as "old" only to contrast it with Yaña imlâ.

Additional characters that could not be found in Arabic and Persian were borrowed from the Chagatai language. The final alphabet was reformed by Qayum Nasiri in the 1870s. In 1920, it was replaced by the Yaña imlâ (which was not an Abjad, but derived from the same source).

This alphabet is currently used by Chinese Tatars, who speak an archaic variant of the Tatar language.

Description

Use of the Arabic script for Tatar was linked to Pan Islam and anti-Sovietism, with the old traditional class promoting Arabic script in opposition to the Soviets.

Based on the standard Arabic alphabet, İske imlâ reflected all vowels in the beginning and end of a word and back vowels in the middle of a word with letters, but front vowels in the middle of a word, as in most Arabic alphabets, were optionally reflected using harakat (diacritics on top of or below consonants). Just as in standard Arabic orthography, letters Alif, Yāʼ and Waw were used to represent all vowels in the beginning and end of a word and back vowels in the middle of a word, with various harakat on top or below them and in these cases the letters actually denoted a vowel. The same harakat that combined with the afore-mentioned letters to make vowels were used in the middle of a word on top of or below a consonant to represent a front vowel.
ı, e, í and i were represented with kasra, whereas ö and ü were represented with damma. O and U also looked the same, but being back vowels, they were represented with the help of Alif and Waw and thus were distinct from ö and ü. Fatḥah represented only one vowel. While the user had to make a conversion of writing into pronunciation, somewhat akin to English, this allowed for more similar orthography between Turkic languages, because words looked more similar even when vowels vary, such as in cases of variations like ö to ü, o to u, or e to i.

Yaña imlâ added separate letters for vowels and thus broke out with standard Arabic alphabets, but spelling followed no standard convention. During that period, the Tatar language had no borrowed vowels and consonants, so Arab loanwords were pronounced using the closest Tatar consonants (see table). European and Russian loanwords were pronounced according to how they could be written with the İske imlâ, so that, for example, "equator" was spelled "ikwatur".

The alphabet

Sample text
Article 1 of the Universal Declaration of Human Rights:

See also
 Tatar alphabet

References

Arabic alphabets
Persian alphabets
Chinese Tatars
Tatar language
Alphabets used by Turkic languages